Mendeleyev Glacier is a glacier,  long, draining northeast through the northern outcrops of the Payer Mountains, in Queen Maud Land, Antarctica. It was mapped from air photos and surveys by the Soviet Antarctic Expedition, 1960–61, and named after Russian chemist Dmitri Mendeleev, whose surname may also be transliterated as "Mendeleyev".

See also
 List of glaciers in the Antarctic
 Glaciology

References

 

Glaciers of Queen Maud Land
Princess Astrid Coast